Gunja is a village and municipality in Croatia.

In the 2011 census, the population was 3,732, with 60.13% declaring themselves Croats, 29.69% as Bosniaks, and 3.32% as Serbs.

The village lies directly across the Sava river from the city of Brčko in Bosnia and Herzegovina. During the Bosnian War, many Muslim and Croat citizens of Brčko lived as refugees in Gunja. The village has a mosque, one of few in Croatia. The settlement was founded in the 18th century by settlers from eastern Bosnia.

Gunja was heavily hit by the 2014 Southeast Europe floods, with estimated property damage in excess of €50 million.

Gallery

See also
Gunja Mosque
Vukovar-Syrmia County
Cvelferija

References

External links
 

Municipalities of Croatia
Populated places in Syrmia
Populated places in Vukovar-Syrmia County
Bosnia and Herzegovina–Croatia border crossings